Vital Ahačič (April 16, 1933 – April 19, 1995) was a Slovenian accordionist and pedagogue. He began his career with the music group Zadovoljni Krajnci and established a trio with Milan Ferlež and Boris Vede. Ahačič published three cassettes with his sister Marija Ahačič Pollak and more than 500 compositions of him are recorded.

Ahačič died on April 19, 1995 in Ljubljana, Slovenia.

References 
 Veliki slovenski leksikon, Mladinska knjiga (2003)
Vital Ahačič

1933 births
1995 deaths
Slovenian accordionists
20th-century accordionists